My Life is a Lifetime Movie is an American reality television series that premiered on Lifetime on October 17, 2012.

Premise
The series mashes together cinematic recreations along with first-hand details with women who relive their shocking life experiences.

Episodes

Critical reception
In a review in The Washington Post, Emily Yahr said that the half-scripted, half-documentary hybrid format doesn't work and the show is delivering a mixed tone. Robert Owen of The Pittsburgh Post-Gazette said the viewers will be disappointed by the series. A review in Variety called the show more like a water-cooler gossip than actual true-crime material. Common Sense Media said the movie has a tongue-in-cheeck tone at times.

References

External links
 
 

2010s American reality television series
2012 American television series debuts
2012 American television series endings
English-language television shows
Lifetime (TV network) original programming